The 1971 FA Charity Shield was a football match between Leicester City and Liverpool at Filbert Street on Saturday 7 August 1971.

Arsenal won the double in 1970–71 but were unable to take part in the Charity Shield because they had contracted to go on a pre-season tour that clashed with the fixture. The 1971 FA Cup Final runners-up Liverpool and second division winners Leicester City were invited to take part instead.

Leicester won the game with a goal from Steve Whitworth, when he tapped the ball in at the near post after initially crossing the ball into the box.

Match details

See also
1970–71 Football League
1970–71 FA Cup

References

1971
Charity Shield 1971
Comm
Charity Shield 1971